Stepan Aleksandrovich Reznik (born 6 January 1983) is a Russian professional football coach and a former player. He manages FC Magnat Krasnodar.

Club career
He made his debut for FC Lokomotiv Moscow on 29 March 2003 in a Russian Premier League Cup game against FC Torpedo-Metallurg Moscow, also making an appearance in the return leg of the matchup. He made his debut for FC Kuban Krasnodar on 24 March 2004 in a Russian Cup game against FC Terek Grozny.

External links
 

1983 births
Sportspeople from Krasnodar
Living people
Russian footballers
Association football midfielders
FC Lokomotiv Moscow players
FC Kuban Krasnodar players
FC Dynamo Barnaul players
FC Dynamo Stavropol players
FC Armavir players
Russian football managers